Franklin Van Valkenburgh (April 5, 1888 – December 7, 1941) was an American naval officer who served as the last captain of the .  He was killed when the Arizona exploded and sank during the attack on Pearl Harbor.

Early life
Born in Minneapolis, Van Valkenburgh moved to Milwaukee when he was a toddler. His father was a prominent lawyer also named Franklin Van Valkenburgh, who served as Milwaukee assistant city attorney and a U.S. attorney for Wisconsin. His great-grandmother's brother was Daniel Wells Jr., who represented Wisconsin's 1st Congressional District in the 1850s. He grew up on Milwaukee's east side, attending Cass Elementary School and graduating from East Side High School, later renamed Riverside High School.

Military service
Franklin Van Valkenburgh was appointed a midshipman at the United States Naval Academy on September 15, 1905, and graduated on June 4, 1909. Traveling to the Asiatic Station soon thereafter, he joined the submarine tender  at Olongapo, Philippine Islands, on September 11,. He reported to the gunboat  as executive officer on June 23, 1914, for a short tour in the southern Philippines before his detachment on August 4,.

After returning to the United States, Lt. (jg.) Van Valkenburgh joined  on November 11,. The entry of the United States into World War I found Van Valkenburgh serving as the battleship's engineering officer. Subsequent temporary duty in the receiving ship at New York preceded his first tour as an instructor at the Naval Academy. On June 1, 1920, Van Valkenburgh reported on board  for duty as engineer officer, and he held that post until the battleship was decommissioned in November 1921.

He again served as an instructor at the Naval Academy—until May 15, 1925—before he joined  on June 26,. Commissioned commander on June 2, 1927, while in Maryland, he soon reported for duty in the Office of the Chief of Naval Operations on May 21, 1928, and served there during the administrations of Admirals Charles F. Hughes and William V. Pratt. Detached on June 28, 1931, Van Valkenburgh received command of the destroyer  on July 10, and commanded Destroyer Squadron 5 from March 31, 1932.

After attending the Naval War College, Newport, R.I., and completing the senior course in May 1934, Comdr. Promoted to captain while commanding Melville—on December 23, 1937—he served as inspector of material for the 3d Naval District from August 6, 1938, to January 22, 1941.

USS Arizona
Newly refitted at Puget Sound Naval Shipyard, Arizona served as flagship of Battleship Division 1 for the remainder of the year, based primarily at Pearl Harbor with two trips to the west coast.

In a letter to a relative, Faith Van Valkenburgh Vilas, dated November 4, 1941, Captain Van Valkenburgh wrote: "We are training, preparing, maneuvering, doing everything we can do to be ready. The work is intensive, continuous, and carefully  planned. We never go to sea without being completely ready to move on to Singapore if need be, without further preparation. Most of our work we are not allowed to talk about off of the ship. I have spent 16 to 20 hours a day on the bridge for a week at a time, then a week of rest, then at it again.

"Our eyes are constantly trained Westward, and we keep the guns ready for instant use against aircraft or submarines whenever we are at sea. We have no intention of being 
caught napping."

Both Captain Van Valkenburgh and the embarked division commander, Rear Admiral Isaac C. Kidd, spent the next Saturday evening, December 6, on board. Suddenly, shortly before 08:00 on December 7, Japanese planes initiated their attack on Pearl Harbor. Captain Van Valkenburgh ran from his cabin and arrived on the navigation bridge, where he immediately began to direct his ship's defense. A quartermaster in the pilot house asked if the captain wanted to go to the conning tower—a less-exposed position in view of the Japanese strafing—but Captain Van Valkenburgh adamantly refused and continued to man a telephone.

A violent explosion suddenly shook the ship, throwing the three occupants of the bridge—Captain Van Valkenburgh, an ensign, and the quartermaster, to the deck, and blowing out all of the bridge windows completely. The ensign managed to escape, but Captain Van Valkenburgh and the quartermaster were never seen again. A continuing fire, fed by ammunition and oil, raged for two days until finally being extinguished on December 9. Despite a thorough search, Captain Van Valkenburgh's body was never found; all that was ever retrieved was his Annapolis class ring.

Captain Van Valkenburgh posthumously received the Medal of Honor—the citation reading in part: "for devotion to duty ... extraordinary courage, and the complete disregard of his own life."

Namesake
In 1943, the destroyer  was named in his honor.

Awards

Medal of Honor citation
Citation:For conspicuous devotion to duty, extraordinary courage and complete disregard of his own life, during the attack on the Fleet in Pearl Harbor T.H., by Japanese forces on 7 December 1941. As commanding officer of the U.S.S. Arizona, Capt. Van Valkenburgh gallantly fought his ship until the U.S.S. Arizona blew up from magazine explosions and a direct bomb hit on the bridge which resulted in the loss of his life.

See also

List of Medal of Honor recipients

References

 Two captains from Milwaukee crossed paths at Pearl Harbor, Meg Jones, Milwaukee Journal Sentinel, Dec. 4, 2016

Specific

Further reading
 "World War II Milwaukee," Meg Jones. The History Press, 2015

1888 births
1941 deaths
United States Navy personnel killed in World War II
American people of Dutch descent
Deaths by Japanese airstrikes during the attack on Pearl Harbor
United States Navy Medal of Honor recipients
United States Naval Academy alumni
Columbia School of Engineering and Applied Science alumni
United States Navy officers
World War II recipients of the Medal of Honor
Military personnel from Minneapolis
Captains who went down with the ship